The ZTE Skate (also marketed as ZTE V960 in China) is a phone manufactured by China's ZTE Corporation for the Android platform. It went on sale in March 2011 in Europe as the Orange Monte Carlo locked to the Orange network.
There is also an upgrade version named ZTE U960 with 1 GHz processor and allowing use of the WCDMA and TD-SCDMA dual-card dual-standard.

See also
 List of Android devices

References

Android (operating system) devices
Skate
Mobile phones introduced in 2011
Discontinued smartphones